Ghukasyan  ) is an Armenian surname, meaning 'son of Ghukas', the Armenian equivalent of Luke. In Russia, Azerbaijan and other countries, some holders of this surname changed the spelling to Gukasov.

People with the surname include:
 Arkadi Ghukasyan (born 1957), second president of the Nagorno-Karabakh Republic
 Siranush Ghukasyan (born 1998), Armenian chess master
 Hovhannes Ghukasyan (1822–1882), Polish-Armenian pharmacist and petroleum industry pioneer, inventor of the modern kerosene lamp

See also
 Arshak Ter-Gukasov (1819–1881), Yerevan Forces commander of Russia's army during the Russo-Turkish War of 1877–1878
 Voroshil Gukasyan (1932–1986), Soviet linguist

Armenian-language surnames
Patronymic surnames
Surnames from given names